Easter lily may refer to:

 Easter Lily (badge), an Irish republican badge

Plants
 Lilium longiflorum, a species of flowering plant in the lily family, commonly called Easter lily
 Zephyranthes atamasco, Atamasco lily or Zephyr lily, a flowering plant, also called Easter lily in the United States
 Zantedeschia aethiopica, Cala lily, a flowering plant, called Easter lily in Ireland
 Echinopsis chiloensis, Easter lily cactus

See also
 Lilium formosanum, Formosa lily, a close relative of L. longiflorum
 Easter (disambiguation)
 Lily (disambiguation)